Majdi Siddiq (born 3 September 1985) is a Qatari footballer of Sudanese descent. He currently plays as a midfielder for Al-Sailiya in the Qatar Stars League. He was a member of the Qatar national football team from 2004 to 2015.

Career statistics
Statistics accurate as of 22 May 2013

1Includes Emir of Qatar Cup.
2Includes Sheikh Jassem Cup.
3Includes AFC Champions League.

International goals
Scores and results list Qatar's goal tally first.

Honours

Club
Al Sadd SC
Qatari Stars Cup: 2010-11

Al-Arabi SC
 Sheikh Jassim Cup: 2011

Al-Sailiya SC
 Qatar FA Cup: 2021
 Qatari Stars Cup: 2020-21

Personal life 
He was married in May 2007.

References

External links 

Player profile – doha-2006.com

1985 births
Living people
Qatari footballers
Qatar international footballers
Al-Khor SC players
Al-Rayyan SC players
2007 AFC Asian Cup players
Qatar Stars League players
Qatari Second Division players
Sudanese emigrants to Qatar
Naturalised citizens of Qatar
Al Sadd SC players
Al-Arabi SC (Qatar) players
Al-Gharafa SC players
Al-Markhiya SC players
Al-Sailiya SC players
El Jaish SC players
Asian Games medalists in football
Footballers at the 2006 Asian Games
Asian Games gold medalists for Qatar
Qatari people of Sudanese descent
Association football midfielders
Medalists at the 2006 Asian Games